Camilla Fangel (born 29 February 1992) is a female Danish handball player who plays for Ringkøbing Håndbold.

References

1992 births
Living people
People from Herning Municipality
Danish female handball players
Handball players at the 2010 Summer Youth Olympics
Beach handball players
Youth Olympic gold medalists for Denmark
Sportspeople from the Central Denmark Region